Mu is an ancient Korean word defining a shaman in the Korean traditional religion. Korean shamans hold rituals called gut (literally "good") for the welfare of the individuals and the society. 

In modern Korea different terms are used to define shamans, including mudang (mostly for females), baksu (only for males), tangol (for hereditary shamans), and musogin ("people who do shamanism", used in the context of organised shamanism).

Etymology
The Korean word 무 mu is related to the Chinese 巫 wu, which defines shamans of either sex. Korean shamanic terminology has, however, at least a partial origin in Siberian languages. Already in records from the Yi dynasty, mudang has a prevalent usage. Mudang itself is explained in relation to Chinese characters, as originally referring to the "hall", 堂 tang, of a shaman. A different etymology, however, explains mudang as stemming directly from the Siberian term for female shamans, utagan or utakan.

Mudang is used mostly, but not exclusively, for female shamans. Male shamans are called by a variety of names, including sana mudang (literally "male mudang") in the Seoul area, or baksu mudang, also shortened baksu ("doctor", "healer"), in the Pyongyang area. According to some scholars, baksu is an ancient authentic designation of male shamans, and locutions like sana mudang or baksu mudang are recent coinages due to the prevalence of female shamans in recent centuries. Baksu may be a Korean adaptation of terms loaned from Siberian languages, such as baksi, balsi or bahsih.

The theory of a Siberian origin of Korean shamanic terminology is more reasonable than theories which explain such terminology as originating in Chinese, given that Chinese culture influenced Korea only at a relatively recent stage of Korean history. Likely, when Koreans adopted Chinese characters they filtered their previously oral religious culture through the sieve of Chinese culture. Another term, mostly used in contemporary South Korea in the context of shamanic associations, is musogin, which means "people who do shamanism".

Role of the mu
The work of the mu is based on the holistic model, which takes into consideration, not only the whole person, but the individual's interaction with his environment, thus both the inner and outer world. The soul is considered the source of life breath, and any physical illness is considered to be inextricably linked with sickness of the soul. Illness of the mind has its cause in soul loss, intrusion or possession by malevolent spirits.

The gut, rites practised by Korean shamans, have gone through a number of changes since the Silla and Goryeo periods. Even during the Joseon dynasty, which established Korean Confucianism as the state religion, shamanic rites persisted. In the past, such rites included agricultural rites, such as prayers for abundant harvest. With a shift away from agriculture in modern Korea, agricultural rites have largely been lost and modern-day shamans are more focused on the spiritual issues of urban life.

Myths about the origin of Korean shamans

In all the myths which figuratively explain the role of the shamans, it is implied that they are media, intermediaries, of higher forms of being. They are not ordained institutionally, but receive ordination from gods, spirits or human ghosts.

Generally, these myths explain that shamans, whom in the most recent history of Korea are regarded as belonging to the lowest class of society (cheonmin 천민), have a forgotten divine or princely nature, often coming from a blood lineage that may be traced back to the early founders of civilisation. Further features of these myths are symbols of divine presence, such as the holy mountain and the holy tree, and tragic or painful experiences.

The bear is an animal often present in such myths, with parallels in the mythologies of Siberia.

Sungmo—the Holy Mother

In a collection of myths, the origin of the shamans is linked to a mother goddess associated with a mountain and presented as either the mother or the spiritual daughter of the "Heavenly King". She has different names according to different regions and associated mountains: Sungmo ("Holy Mother"), Daemo ("Great Mother"), Jamo ("Benevolent Mother"), Sinmo ("Divine Mother"), Nogo ("Olden Maiden"), and others. In other myths she is a mortal princess who is later turned into a goddess.

These myths usually tell of a man, Pobu Hwasang, who encountered the "Holy Mother [of the Heavenly King]" on the top of a mountain. The Holy Mother then became a human being and married the man who met her, giving birth to eight girls, the first mudang. According to some scholars, this myth was first elaborated in the Silla period, when Buddhism and influences from China had already penetrated the Korean peninsula.

The myth of the princess is the most popular, and it differs from region to region. In one of the versions, the princess is Ahwang Kongju of the Yao kingdom, located on the Asian mainland. The princess had a strong link with divinity, granting welfare to her people. Her father sent the princess among the people, whom began to worship her for her healing powers. The first mudang were established as her successors. The princess is worshipped with seasonal offerings in Chungcheong. The yellow and red clothes worn by the mudang are regarded as Ahwang Kongju's robes.

In the north of the Korean peninsula the princess is known as Chil Kongju (the "Seventh Princess"), seventh amongst the daughters of the king. The myth tells that she was rejected by her father, who sealed her in a stone coffin and cast it into a pond, but she was rescued by a Dragon King sent by the Heavenly King, and ascended to the western sky becoming the goddess of healing waters. Names of the goddess in other local traditions Pali Kongju and Kongsim. In the tradition of Jeju Island, where there are more male baksu than female mudang, the myth tells of a prince as the ancestor of all shamans.

Dangun—the Sandalwood King

Dangun is traditionally considered to be the grandson of Hwanin, the "Heavenly King", and founder of the Korean nation. This myth is reputed to be older than that of the mother goddess. Myths similar to that of Dangun are found in Ainu and Siberian cultures.

The myth starts with prince Hwanung ("Heavenly Prince"), son of Hwanin. The prince asked his father to grant him governance over Korea. Hwanin accepted, and Hwanung was sent to Earth bearing three Heavenly Seals and accompanied by three thousand followers. The prince arrived under the holy tree of sandalwood (Sintansu 신단수, 神檀樹) on the holy mountain, where he founded his holy city.

At the time of his reign, Ungnyeo or Ungnye (웅녀, 熊女)—who was a she-bear—and a tiger were living in a cave near the holy city, praying earnestly that their wish to become part of mankind might be fulfilled. Ungnyeo patiently endured weariness and hunger, and after twenty-one days she was transformed into a beautiful woman, while the tiger ran away for it could not tolerate the effort. The woman Ungnyeo was overjoyed, and visiting the sandalwood city she prayed that she might become the mother of a child.

Ungnye's wish was fulfilled, so that she became the queen and gave birth to a prince who was given the royal name of Dangun, the "Sandalwood King". Dangun reigned as the first human king of Korea, giving to his kingdom the name of Joseon, "Land of the Morning Calm".

According to some scholars, the name Dangun is related to the Siberian Tengri ("Heaven"), while the bear is a symbol of the Big Dipper (Ursa Major). Later in the myth, Dangun becomes the Sansin, the "Mountain God" (metaphorically of civilising growth, prosperity).

Types of Korean shamans
Korean shamans may be classified into two categories: ❶ sessǔmu or tangol (당골), people who are shamans and have the right to perform rites by family lineage; and ❷ kangshinmu, people who become shamans through an initiation ceremony. Hereditary shamans were historically concentrated in the southern part of the Korean peninsula, while initiated shamans were found throughout the entire peninsula but were peculiar to the northern half, the contiguous areas of China inhabited by Koreans, and the central regions along the Han River.

Kangshinmu—initiated shamans

Kangshinmu (강신무; 降神巫) are historically found throughout Korea, but they are peculiar to the central and northern regions of the peninsula and the lands of modern-day China contiguous to the northern part of the peninsula. The essential characteristic of the kangshinmu is that they acquire their status by being "chosen" and possessed by a god. There are two subtypes of kangshinmu: ① General mudang and ② myǒngdu.

A person becomes a kangshinmu undergoing a period of shinbyeong (神病), "divine illness". The possession by the god is said to be accompanied by physical pain and psychosis. Believers assert that the "divine illness" may not be healed through medical treatments, but only through the full communion with the spirit.

Mudang are shamans who are possessed by a god or a spirit, called a momju. They perform fortune telling using spiritual powers derived from their possession, and lead gut rituals involving song and dance. A sub-type of mudang is the sǒnmudang  or posal, who are thought to have acquired power through spiritual experience, but are still not worthy of holding an orthodox gut. Many male shamans, baksu, belong to this category.

Myǒngdu differ from the general mudang in that they channel the spirit of a dead person, usually a young child related to the myǒngdu himself, rather than a god, and invite such spirits to take residence into shrines set up in their homes. Myǒngdu are found primarily in the Honam region of Korea.

Seseummu—hereditary shamans
Seseummu (세습무; 世襲巫), found in the area south of the Han River, receive their status as shamans by family bloodline. There are two subtypes of seseummu: ① Simbang and ② tangol.

The simbang-type shamans are found only in Jeju Island, and combine features of the mudang and dan'gol types. Like the mudang, the simbang of Jeju are associated with a specific set of gods. But these gods do not inhabit the shaman's body but are externalized in the form of the mengdu, a set of sacred ritual implements in which the gods and spirits of dead shamans are embodied. The simbang'''s basic task is to understand the divine message conveyed by their mengdu and to use the mengdu to worship the gods.Tangol are a type of shaman found predominantly in the southernmost regions of the Korean peninsula, especially in Yeongnam (Gyeongsang) and Honam area (Jeolla). Each one of the tangol families of Honam had districts of influence (tangolpan) in which they had the exclusive right to perform gut rites. Rituals performed by tangol involve song and dance to entertain a god or goddess. Both the rights of succession and the ceremonies have been systematised, so that they now bear the characteristics of a religious institution. Unlike other types of Korean shamans, tangol do not receive a particular god as part of an initiation ceremony and may therefore work with a variety of gods. They do not keep shrines in their homes.

See also
Muism
Wu (shaman)—Wuism
Miko
Shamanism

Notes

References
  Volume I: The Ancient Eurasian World and the Celestial Pivot, Volume II: Representations and Identities of High Powers in Neolithic and Bronze China, Volume III: Terrestrial and Celestial Transformations in Zhou and Early-Imperial China''.
 
 
 
 

Korean shamanism